James Cossins (4 December 1933 – 12 February 1997) was an English character actor. Born in Beckenham, Kent, he became widely recognised as the abrupt, bewildered Mr Walt in the Fawlty Towers episode "The Hotel Inspectors" and as Mr Watson, the frustrated Public Relations training course instructor, in an episode of Some Mothers Do 'Ave 'Em.

Early life
He was born in Beckenham and educated at the City of London School. After serving in the Royal Air Force, he trained at Royal Academy of Dramatic Art, where he won the silver medal in 1952.

Career
He first appeared in repertory theatre and at the Nottingham Playhouse. He played a wide range of characters throughout his colourful and extensive career on television and stage, often portraying blustering, pompous, crusty and cantankerous characters. Cossins appeared in Charley's Aunt at the Apollo Theatre in 1971 with Tom Courtenay, David Horovitch, Garth Forwood, Joanna McCallum, and Celia Bannerman. He appeared in more than forty films, including The Anniversary (recreating his West End stage role), and The Lost Continent (both 1968), Gandhi (1982), and The Man with the Golden Gun (1974). 

On the small screen, he appeared as a guest in a variety of shows, including  The Likely Lads and Whatever Happened to the Likely Lads?, Minder, Bergerac, The Sweeney, Bless This House, Shadows, All Creatures Great and Small, Citizen Smith, Just William, The Good Life, L for Lester, Neville Dennis in Callan "Rules of the Game" (1972), Z-Cars, and as the regular character Bruce Westrop (in 1979) in Emmerdale Farm. He also played Major Bagstock in Dombey and Son (1983), and appeared in the first series of All in Good Faith in 1985. He played a magistrate in episodes of four different British sitcoms, Whatever Happened to the Likely Lads?, The Good Life, Citizen Smith and Minder.

His later appearances were limited by ill health and he lived in semi-retirement in Surrey. Cossins died from heart disease at the age of 63, in 1997.

Filmography

Film

 Darling (1965) as Basildon
 The Deadly Bees (1966) as  Coroner
 Privilege (1967) as  Professor Tatham
 How I Won the War (1967) as  Drogue
 The Anniversary (1968) as Henry Taggart
 A Dandy in Aspic (1968) as Heston-Stevas
 The Lost Continent (1968) as Nick, Chief Engineer
 Otley (1968) as Geffcock
 Scrooge (1970) as Party Guest 
 The Horror of Frankenstein (1970) as Dean
 The Rise and Rise of Michael Rimmer (1970) as Crodder
 Wuthering Heights (1970 as Mr. Linton
 Say Hello to Yesterday (1971) as Policeman
 Melody (1971) as Headmaster
 Villain (1971) as Brown
 Blood from the Mummy's Tomb (1971) as Older Male Nurse
 Death Line (1972) as James Manfred, OBE
 Fear in the Night (1972) as The Doctor
 Follow Me! (1972) as Party Guest 
 Young Winston (1972) as Barnsby
 Bequest to the Nation (1973) as McKillop - HMS Victory
 Hitler: The Last Ten Days (1973) as German Officer
 The Man with the Golden Gun (1974) as Colthorpe
 The First Great Train Robbery (1979) as Harranby
 Loophole (1981) as 1st Interviewer
 Sphinx (1981) as Lord Carnarvon
 Gandhi (1982) as Brigadier
 Immaculate Conception (1992) as Godfrey

Television

 The Dangerous Game (1958, 1 episode) as Auctioneer
 Saturday Playhouse (1959, 1 episode) as Frank Coppin
 Theatre Night (1961, 1 episode) as Edgar Lucas, the bride's father
 The Caucasian Chalk Circle (1962, 3 episodes) as Schauwa
 Z-Cars (1962-1963, 11 episodes) as Sergeant Michaelson
 Compact  (1963, 13 episodes) as Newcastle Pope
 Armchair Theatre (1963-1973, 3 episodes) as Partridge
 ITV Television Playhouse (1963, 1 episode) as Hilliard
 The Sullavan Brothers (1965, 1 episode) as Maurice Ashley
 Londoners (1965, 1 episode) as  The interviewer
 No Hiding Place (1965, 1 episode) as 'Muddy' Waters
 Coronation Street (1965, 1 episode) as Interviewer 
 The Man in Room 17 (1965, 1 episode) as  Harry Morrison
 Legend of Death (1965, 4 episodes) as Irwin
 The Likely Lads (1965-1966, 2 epsidoes) as Scoutmaster/Vicar
 Mystery and Imagination (1966, 1 episode) as Landlord
 The Power Game (1966-1969, 2 episodes) as  Henry Outram/Candleford
 Theatre 625 (1966, 1 episode) as Henry 
 The Fellows  (1967, 1 episode) as Visitor
 Out of the Unknown (1967, 1 episode) as Interviewer
 The Contenders (1969, 1 episode) as Bloater
 Strange Report (1969, 1 episode) as Churchill
 Dr. Finlay's Casebook (1969, 1 episode) as Robbie Cannock
 The ITV Play (1969, 1 episode) as  Mr. Peachham
 The Avengers (1969, 1 episode) as Henry
 Paul Temple (1970, 1 episode)  as  Inspector Lescoe
 The Wednesday Play (1970, 1 episode) as Colonel Jones-William
 Thirty-Minute Theatre (1970, 1 episode) as Tim Singleton
 Dear Mother...Love Albert (1970-1972, 2 episodes) as S.M.N. Beanstock/Col. Tomlinson
 Special Branch (1970, 1 episode) as Det. Sgt. Davis
 Menace (1970, 1 episode) as Controller 
 Bless This House (1971, 1 episode) as  Tom Williams
 The Ten Commandments (1971, 1 episode) as Tom
 Bel Ami (1971, 4 episodes) as Forestier
Dr. Jervis
 Play for Today (1971, 3 episodes) as Jeremy
 Callan (1972, 1 episode) as Neville Dennis
 Pretenders (1972, 13 episodes) as  Old Elam
 The Incredible Robert Baldick: Never Come Nigh (1972, 1 episode) as Rev. Peter Elmstead
 Man at the Top (1972, 1 episode) as  Colonel Broadhurst
 A Day Out (1972, TV film) as Shorter
 Crown Court (1973, 4 episodes) as Graham Erringburn
 Thriller (1973, 1 episode) as Kellet
 Harriet's Back in Town (1973, 2 episodes) as Arthur
 Marked Personal (1973, 2 episodes) as J.C. Smart
 Van der Valk (1973, 1 episode) as  Noordhoff
 Some Mothers Do 'Ave 'Em  (1973, 1 episode) as Watson
 Whatever Happened to the Likely Lads? (1974, 1 episode) as Magistrate
 Fall of Eagles (1974, 1 episode) as Count Josi Hoyos
 The Pallisers (1974, 2 episodes) as Sergeant Bunfit
 Justice (1974, 1 episode) as Mr. Ritson
 The Double Dealers (1974, 1 episode) as Sir Julian
 Good Girl (1974, 1 episode) as Manager
 Oh No, It's Selwyn Froggitt (1974, 1 episode) as Chairman
 Notorious Woman (1974, 1 episode) as Gustave Flaubert
 Centre Play (1975, 1 episode) as Burret
 Churchill's People (1975, 1 episode) as  William
 Fawlty Towers (1975, 1 episode) as Mr. Walt
 Shadows (1975, 1 episode) as Custodian
 The Good Life (1976, 1 episode) as Magistrate
 Jackanory (1976, 6 episodes) as Storyteller
 Love Thy Neighbour (1976, 1 episode) as George Brittain
 One-Upmanship (1976, 1 episode)
Shop assistant
 The Sweeney (1976, 1 episode) as Col. Rosier
 Don't Forget to Write! (1977-1979, 3 episodes) as Phillip Mounter
 Bernie (1978, 2 episodes) as Various parts
 The Devil's Crown (1978, 1 episode) as Hugues de Lusignan
 Just William (1978, 1 episode) as Uncle Frederick
 Prince Regent (1979, 1 episode) as Sir Robert Gifford
 All Creatures Great and Small (1980, 1988, 2 episodes) as Aloysius Barge
 Citizen Smith (1980, 1 episode) as  Judge
 The Jim Davidson Show (1980, 1 episode) as Various parts
 Jukes of Piccadilly (1980, 2 episodes) as  Geoffrey Martindale
 Why Didn't They Ask Evans? (1980, TV film) as Henry Bassington-ffrench
 Bergerac (1981, 2 episodes) as Tuchel/Calhoun
 Roger Doesn't Live Here Anymore (1981, 2 episodes) as Baxter
 Shelley (1981, 1 episode) as  Bernard Nelson
 Timon of Athens (1981, TV film) as Lucullus
 Winston Churchill: The Wilderness Years (1981, 1 episode) as Lord Lothian
 The Confessions of Felix Krull (1982, 5 episodes) as Lord Kilmarnock
 L for Lester (1982, 6 episodes) as Chief Insp. Rodgers
 Minder (1982, 1 episode) as Judge
 Dombey and Son  (1983, 5 episodes) as Major Bagstock
 Goodnight and God Bless (1983, 6 episodes) as Geoffrey
 Nanny (1983, 1 episode) as Mr. Croome
 Number 10 (1983, 1 episode) as Lord Harcourt
 The Lady Is a Tramp (1984, 1 episode) as Man
 The Masks of Death (1984, TV film) as Frederick Baines
 Sharing Time (1984, 1 episode) as Arthur
 Strangers and Brothers (1984, 3 episodes) as Mr. Knight 
 All in Good Faith (1985, 5 episodes) as Major Andrews
 My Brother Jonathan (1985, 2 episodes) as Reverend Perry
 Marjorie and Men (1985, 4 episodes) as Henry Bartlett
 The Pickwick Papers (1985, 1 episode) as Nupkins
 Up the Elephant and Round the Castle (1985, 1 episode) as The Major
 Call Me Mister (1986, 1 episode) as  Charlie Staples
 Miss Marple (1987, 1 episode) as Colonel Luscombe
 Grand Larceny (1987, TV film)
 Rude Health (1988, 1 episode) as Col. Jardine
 Chelworth (1989, 2 episodes) as Mr. Kilbeck
 Woof! (1990, 1 episode) as  Mr. Hudson
 Murder Most Horrid (1991, 1 episode) as Sir Hugh Lotterby
Adam Dalgliesh (1993, 1 episode) as Justin Bryce
 Under the Hammer (1994, 1 episode) as Meredith Bland

References

External links
 

1933 births
1997 deaths
English male film actors
English male television actors
People from Beckenham
Male actors from Kent
20th-century Royal Air Force personnel
Alumni of RADA
People educated at the City of London School
20th-century English male actors